Emu Flat is the name of several places in Australia:
 Emu Flat, South Australia in the Clare Valley
 Emu Flat, Victoria southeast of Bendigo
 Emu Flat, Western Australia east of Kalgoorlie in the City of Kalgoorlie-Boulder